The 2004 UCLA Bruins softball team represented the University of California, Los Angeles in the 2004 college softball season.  The Bruins were coached by Sue Enquist, in her sixteenth season.  The Bruins played their home games at Easton Stadium and finished with a record of 47–9.  They competed in the Pacific-10 Conference, where they finished fourth with a 12–8 record.

The Bruins were invited to the 2004 NCAA Division I softball tournament, where they swept the West Regional and then completed a run through the Women's College World Series to claim their tenth Women's College World Series Championship.  The Bruins had earlier claimed an AIAW title in 1978 and NCAA titles in 1982, 1984, 1988, 1989, 1990, 1992, 1995, 1999, and 2003.  The 1995 championship was vacated by the NCAA.

Personnel

Roster

Coaches

Schedule

References

UCLA
UCLA Bruins softball seasons
2004 in sports in California
Women's College World Series seasons
NCAA Division I softball tournament seasons